Saros cycle series 112 for lunar eclipses occurs at the moon's ascending node, 18 years 11 and 1/3 days. It contains 72 events, with 15 total eclipses, starting in 1364 and ending in 1616. Solar Saros 119 interleaves with this lunar Saros with an event occurring every 9 years 5 days alternating between each saros series.

This lunar saros is linked to Solar Saros 119.

The series contains 15 total lunar eclipses between 1364 and 1616. It contains twenty-one partial eclipses from 985 AD to 1346 and twenty-two more between 1634 and 2013.

The last occurrence of this series was a partial lunar eclipse on April 25, 2013, which was the last partial lunar eclipse of this series. The next occurrence on May 7, 2031, will be the first of the final set of penumbral lunar eclipses.

The series started on May 20, 859 AD.

The series will end on July 12, 2139.

Summary
Lunar Saros series 112, repeating every 18 years and 11 days, has a total of 72 lunar eclipse events including 15 total lunar eclipses.

First Penumbral Lunar Eclipse: 859 May 20

First Partial Lunar Eclipse: 985 Aug 03

First Total Lunar Eclipse: 1364 Mar 18

First Central Lunar Eclipse: 1436 Apr 30

Greatest Eclipse of the Lunar Saros 112: 1490 Jun 02

Last Central Lunar Eclipse: 1562 Jul 16

Last Total Lunar Eclipse: 1616 Aug 27

Last Partial Lunar Eclipse: 2013 Apr 25

Last Penumbral Lunar Eclipse: 2139 Jul 12

The greatest eclipse of the series occurred on 1490 Jun 02, lasting 100 minutes.

List

See also 
 List of lunar eclipses
 List of Saros series for lunar eclipses

Notes

External links 
 www.hermit.org: Saros 112

Lunar saros series